Creatinolfosfate (creatinol-O-phosphate, creatinol phosphate, COP) is a cardiac preparation, not to be confused with phosphocreatine.

Guanidines
Organophosphates